Meliton Soriano (born November 13, 1974) also known as stage name Mel Martinez is a notable Filipino movie and TV actor.  He is the brother of actress Maricel Soriano, and the uncle of Meryl Soriano.

Filmography

Television

Movies
Batang Quiapo - Totoy
TOPAK (1987-1992)
Bunsong Kerubin (1987) - Avelino
Kid, Huwag kang Susuko (1987)
Rosa Mistica (1988)
Love Letters (1988)
Super Inday and the Golden Bibe (1988)
Estudyante Blues (1989) - Mel
Teacher's Enemy No. 1 (1990)
Rocky N Rolly (1990)
Bikining Itim (1990) - Apeng
Wooly Booly 2(1990)
T.O.P.A.K. (1993-1998)
Tom & Jerry: Hindi Kaming Hayop (1993) - Jerry
Johnny Guess: Ang Taong Laging Nagtatanong (1994) - Jun-Jun
Wala Na Bang Pag-ibig (1997)
Muling ibalik ang tamis ng pag-ibig (1998) - Donita
Ikaw Lamang (1999)
Still Lives (1999) - Camille
Annie B. (2004)
House Da Riles (2004-2005)
Roxxxane (2007) - Valenne
Maling Akala (2007)
Momzillas (2013)
 Die Beautiful (2016)
 D' Aswang Slayerz (2023)

References

External links

1974 births
Living people
Filipino LGBT actors
ABS-CBN personalities
GMA Network personalities
Filipino male film actors
LGBT male actors